is a 1986 MSX2 role-playing video game by Konami. It was released only in Japan and based on the movie of the same year, King Kong Lives (King Kong 2 being the film's title in Japan). Similar to Konami's later Hi no Tori games, two separate games were developed together and released for the MSX and Famicom respectively. While the Famicom King Kong 2: Ikari no Megaton Punch has players playing as King Kong in a more action-oriented format similar to Nintendo's The Legend of Zelda, Yomigaeru Densetsu has players playing as Mitchell in a role-playing style.

The game was unofficially re-released in English by the South Korean company Zemina in 1987, as 킹콩II (King Kong II).

External links
 King Kong 2 - Generation MSX
 

1986 video games
King Kong (franchise) video games
MSX2 games
MSX2-only games
Konami games
Japan-exclusive video games
Unauthorized video games
Video games developed in Japan